Aurnupen Peak is a peak with a gravel moraine on the northwest side, situated  north of Flarjuven Bluff on the Ahlmann Ridge in Queen Maud Land. It was mapped by Norwegian cartographers from surveys and from air photos by the Norwegian-British-Swedish Antarctic Expedition (1949–1952), led by John Schjelderup Giæver and named Aurnupen (the gravel peak).

References
 

Mountains of Queen Maud Land
Princess Martha Coast